The 1937 Milan–San Remo was the 30th edition of the Milan–San Remo cycle race and was held on 19 March 1937. The race started in Milan and finished in San Remo. The race was won by Cesare Del Cancia of the  team.

General classification

References

Milan–San Remo
Milan–San Remo
Milan–San Remo
Milan–San Remo